KF Shkodra is a football club based in Shkodër, Albania.

Club colors: Purple, White, Black.   

Ground: Shkodër, Albania 

Slogan Club: "Shkodra You'll never walk alone" 

Mascot: "Ariu" (Bear)

Anthem: -

History
Klubi i Futbollit "Shkodra" was founded on November 9, 1996 by Taip Piraniqi, a former footballer and manager of Vllaznia Shkodër. It was the second team within the city. The football club "Shkodra" created a system of youth teams composed of athletes from ages 7 to 19. It has six coaches., The process is followed and monitored by Piraniqi. During its 21-year duration, the club produced high-level players. The two best known players are Albania international footballers Elseid Hysaj and Armando Vajushi. Other players from the ranks of the club include Arsid Kruja, Antonio Marku, Sindri Guri, Rubin Xhepaj, Ervin Rexha, Marçelino Preka, Donati Toma, Rejan Alivoda and Elis Kabuni.

The club has an important football academy which includes a highly respected coaching staff.

2019/2020 champion 
kategoria e pare" Under 19.

For its 25th (09 November 2021), the club adopted the slogan "You'll never walk alone".

In February 2022 the youth team (year 2010) is invited to participate in the international tournament "Mimoza Polino Cup" in Montenegro. The team lost 2-1 in the final, but took a prestigious second place.

August 2022 - The club undertakes a collaboration with Vllaznia to enhance the young players of the territory

In 1996 the colors of the club jerseys were "Yellow and Black", then KF Shkodra adopted the colors: Purple, White, Black which are still the official colors of the club today.

Club

CLUB ORGANIZATION CHART

• Taip Piraniqi (Director)

• Rudi Piraniqi (Head coach)

• Arbion Kopliku (Administrator)

• Marco Rapo (Manager)

• Heldi Hasani (Coach Goalkeepers')

• Ersi Çaku (Coach)

• Semir Gokaj (Coach)

• Adket Beqiri (Coach)

• Luigj Ograja (Coach)

• Khaled Hoxha (Coach)

- SPONSOR CLUB -

• Argjendari Shkodra 

• B52 

• Pro Branding 

TECHNICAL SPONSOR
• Macron

SOCIAL NETWORK 
The club is now with its official pages on: facebook, twitter, instagram

External links
KF Shkodra club profile at FSHF.org

 
Albanian Third Division clubs
Football clubs in Shkodër
Football clubs in Albania
Association football clubs established in 1996
1996 establishments in Albania
Sport in Shkodër